Blackburn High School is a public secondary school for both girls and boys in years 7 to 12 in Blackburn North, a suburb of Melbourne, Victoria, Australia, founded in 1956.

The school has performed in prestigious music events such as The Victorian School Music Festival, The Royal South Street Competition and Generations in Jazz Competition in Mount Gambier, which they have won a number of times.

Notable alumni

Christos Tsiolkas - Novelist
Ross Irwin - Trumpet player in Melbourne based band 'The Cat Empire'.
Shannon Barnett - Trombonist, Bell Awards winner for Young Australian Jazz Artist (2007)
Daniel Merriweather - R&B Singer/Songwriter.
Reuben Morgan - Singer/Songwriter at the Hillsong Church
Darren James - 3AW Radio Announcer
Don Scott - Former Hawthorn AFL Football Club Captain & Premiership Player & South Adelaide coach.
Dee Ryall MP - Former member for Mitcham and Ringwood in the Victorian Parliament
Jenny Donnet - Olympic and Commonwealth Games diving athlete
Steve Irons - Federal Member for Swan (WA) 2007
Jacinta Parsons- Radio host
Timothy Fehring - student who died on a school camp

References

Public high schools in Melbourne
Educational institutions established in 1956
1956 establishments in Australia
Buildings and structures in the City of Whitehorse